ʿAqīl ibn Abī Ṭālib (lit. "Aqil the Son of Abu Talib"; full name), was a cousin of the Islamic prophet Muhammad and an older brother of Ali and Ja'far ibn Abi Talib.

Having fought on the side of the Qurayshi rulers of Mecca against Muhammad and the early Muslims, he converted to Islam a few years before the death of the prophet . Under the second caliph Umar, he was appointed a position as an expert in the genealogy of the Quraysh. During the rivalry between his brother Ali (who reigned as the fourth caliph  until his death ) and Mu'awiya (the first Umayyad caliph) Aqil first chose the side of his brother, but later may have deserted him in favor of Mu'awiya, as the latter offered him better financial incentives.

He was noted by later authors for his eloquence as well as for transmitting a number of hadith. Most notably, the great majority of Somali clans claim to be descended from Aqil ibn Abi Talib, though this is historically untenable.

Biography

Having initially fought against Muhammad at the Battle of Badr (624), in which he was taken prisoner and later bought free by his uncle Abbas ibn Abd al-Muttalib, he converted to Islam around 629 or 630. He may have participated at the Muslim side in the battles of Mu'tah (629) and Hunayn (630).

After the victory of the Muslims and the death of Muhammad , Aqil lived in the military encampments of Kufa and Basra for a while, supporting his brother Ali (who ruled from Medina as the fourth caliph). However, later he may have abandoned Ali, as he moved to Syria in order to join the court of the first Umayyad caliph Mu'awiya I. According to later tradition, Aqil's change of heart was motivated by the fact that Mu'awiya was more willing than Ali to pay his debts. While he may have given up the Hashimite claims to the caliphate and politically supported the rival claim of the Umayyads instead, he always defended his brother Ali against any criticism leveled against him at Mu'awiya's court.

Aqil was an expert on the genealogy of the Quraysh tribe (the leading tribe of Mecca, to which both the Hashimite and Umayyad families belonged). The second caliph Umar appointed him to record the names of the members of the Quraysh in the clan register (the ), and to arbitrate disputes with regard to genealogy.

He was married to Fatima bint Utba, with whom he had several children (the most famous of them being Muslim ibn Aqil). Contrary to their father, a number of his sons decided to fight for the Hashimite cause and were martyred along with their cousin Husayn ibn Ali at the Battle of Karbala . Aqil himself died in Medina, having become blind, either  or (according to another report) .

Legacy

Multiple prophetic traditions (hadiths) were transmitted on Aqil's authority, and he also figured in hadiths related by others.

Aqil was often cited by later writers for his eloquence and his witty rejoinders, addressed both against his wife  and against Mu'awiya. He seems to have been a rich man, owning multiple properties both in Mecca and in Medina.

Claims of ancestry by Somali clans

Most notably, the great majority of Somali clans trace their ancestry to Aqil ibn Abi Talib, either through Samaale (the source of the name 'Somali'; purported forefather of the northern pastoralist clans such as the Hawiye, the Dir, and –matrilineally through the Dir– the Isaaq and the Darod), through Sab (the purported forefather of the southern cultivating clans such as the Digil or the Rahanweyn), or through Darod (the purported forefather of the northern Darod clan). Although these genealogical claims are historically untenable, they do reflect the longstanding cultural contacts between Somalia (especially, though not exclusively, its most northern part Somaliland) and Southern Arabia.

References

Works cited

580s births
670 deaths
683 deaths
Companions of the Prophet
Banu Hashim